L/40 caliber
|barrels=12
|action=
|rate=
|velocity=
|range=
|max_range= (9M542 rocket) (9M544 rocket)
|feed=
|sights=

|breech=
|recoil=
|carriage=
|elevation=
|traverse=

|blade_type=
|hilt_type=
|sheath_type=
|head_type=
|haft_type=

|diameter=
|filling=
|filling_weight=
|detonation=
|yield=

|armour=
|primary_armament= 9M55 or 9M528 rockets
|secondary_armament=
|engine= D12A-525A V12 diesel engine 
|engine_power=
|pw_ratio=
|suspension= 8×8 wheeled
|vehicle_range=
|speed=
}}

The BM-30 Smerch ("tornado", "whirlwind"), 9K58 Smerch or 9A52-2 Smerch-M is a heavy self-propelled 300 mm multiple rocket launcher designed in the Soviet Union to fire a full load of 12 solid-fuelled projectiles. The system is intended to defeat personnel, armored, and soft targets in concentration areas, artillery batteries, command posts and ammunition depots. It was designed in the early 1980s and entered service in the Soviet Army in 1989. When first observed by the West in 1983, it received the code MRL 280mm M1983. It continues in use by Russia; a program to replace it with the 9A52-4 Tornado began in 2018.

Operational history
The first confirmed combat uses of the Smerch were in two war zones in 2014. Syrian military forces used the system against rebel forces during the Syrian civil war, including in fighting in Jobar. It was also used by Russia-backed militants to deliver explosive and cluster munitions to Ukrainian military positions and likewise by the Ukrainian Army. Several have been seen in use by pro-Russian rebels. The Russian Ground Forces used the BM-30 in Syria in October 2015 during the Russian intervention in Syria.

During the 2020 Nagorno-Karabakh conflict, Armenia and Azerbaijan both targeted the other country's territory with Smerch rockets.

Smerch rockets were fired from Belgorod in the 2022 Russian Invasion of Ukraine. As Smerch rockets are a Multiple Launch Rocket System, using these to attack a densely populated area of civilians caused some to call the action a war crime. The Human Rights Watch also claims that Smerch cluster munitions 9M55K (containing 72 9N235 submunitions) were fired into densely populated neighborhoods in Kharkiv, resulting in the deaths of at least 11 civilians. During the Battle of Kharkiv it is alleged that 11 Smerch rockets were fired on 27–28 February alone.

Components
The main components of the RSZO 9K58 "Smerch" system are the following:
 Rockets 9M55 or 9M528 (in containers);
 BM 9A52-2 launch vehicle;
 TZM 9T234-2 transloader with an 850 kg crane and 12 spare rockets;
 Automated fire control equipment in the command post 1K123 "Vivary";
 Maintenance vehicle PM-2-70 MTO-V;
 Set of arsenal equipment 9F819;
 Training facilities 9F827 and 9F840.

300mm rockets with a firing range of 70 and 90 km and various warheads have been developed for the Smerch MLRS.

The 9A52-2 vehicle with the automated system ensures:
 delivery of fire from an un-surveyed fire position;
 laying of the launch tube cluster with the crew staying in the cabin and without using aiming points;
 autonomous determination of an azimuth of the launch tube cluster's longitudinal axis;
 visual representation of graphical information for the launch tube cluster laying, the route of vehicle movement and location as well as a point of destination and direction of movement on the video terminal;
 increase in MLRS survivability owing to reduced time of staying at a fire position;
 increased comfort for the laying operator, especially in adverse weather conditions and at night;
 increased independent operation owing to the navigation and survey equipment, which allows the vehicle to rapidly change fire positions and move autonomously;
 reduction of the combat crew.

General characteristics 
 Chassis: MAZ-543M or MAZ-79111
 Emplacement Time: 3 min
 Displacement Time: 2 min
 Launch Rate
 Salvo Time: 12 rounds in 38 seconds
 Reload Time: 20 min

Variants 

 9A52 – Standard variant on MAZ-79111 truck.
 9A52-2 – Modified variant on MAZ-543M truck.
 9A52-2T – Export version, based on the Tatra T816 10×10 truck.
 9A52-4 – Lighter, airmobile version on KamAZ-6350 truck with modular 6-round rocket pack. Demonstrated in 2007.
 Arctic version with rockets mounted on DT-30PM tracked vehicle.
 9A54 – Tornado-S, upgraded with a GLONASS receiver and automated digital FCS.

Rocket projectiles

Operators

Current operators
  – 50 systems in 1999.
  – 6 systems. Received more as of 2018.
  – 40 systems.
  – 48 systems in 1990.
  – Locally produced as the PHL-03.
  – Total 81 9A52-2T systems in service. The launchers for the Indian Army's 9K58 Smerch 300 mm multiple launch (MLR) systems are mounted on Indian made T816 KOLOS TATRA, making it roughly 162 batteries of 3 launchers each with 3 as reserve launchers. Which makes it a total of 972 launchers in service. Each launcher has been provided with its own ammunition replenishment vehicle based on the same T816. Since 2012 India's state-owned Ordnance Factory Board has produced several rocket variants for the system that have a strike range of 70 or 90 km.
 
  – 27 systems in 1996.
  – 36 systems PHL03/AR2 Chinese version.
  – 36 units, more produced locally as the A-100E with complete TOT, based on the Chinese A-100,
  – 106. More in production (in 2020).
  – Unknown number, used in the Syrian civil war.
  – 6 systems 9A52-2T in 2008/2009.
  – 80 as of 2014.
  – 6 systems.
  – 12 systems.

Former operators 
 : Passed on to successor states.
  – 0 systems in 2016.

Similar systems 
  – Visually similar missile based on the Wanshan WS-2400 8x8 cross country truck. However, the PHL-03 and BM-30 do not share interchangeable parts, so they are distinct missiles despite their similar appearance. The Chinese vehicle utilizes a German-designed diesel engine, transmission and hydraulics, manufactured by Wanshan in China, following a technology transfer from ZF Friedrichshafen. The program actually begun in the late 1990s, with the '96' in the designation reportedly meaning 1996, the year that the Chinese military first issued the requirement for a new long range SPMRLS. The program went through major redesign changes when the BM-30 Smerch was purchased. Although dubbed by many Chinese as a guided self-propelled multiple rocket launching system (SPMRLS), the PHL96 is not strictly speaking a guided SPMRLS because, technically, none of rockets are guided – the guidance is actually achieved via the sub-munitions, such as the 9M55K1 cluster munition. Only a very limited number of the PHL96 entered Chinese service because its successor, the PHL03, entered service shortly after.

 A-100 – A 300 mm, 10-tube multiple rocket launcher developed by the Beijing-based China Academy of Launch Vehicle Technology (CALT) in the late 1990s. The A-100 has a minimum firing range of 40 km & a maximum firing range of 100 km.
 PHL-03 – Chinese development of the PHL96 with 150 km range. The PHL03 is a highly digitized PHL96 with a computerized fire control system (FCS) incorporating GPS/GLONASS, similar to that of the Type 90A SPMRL, with a four-man crew (compared with three for the BM-30/PHL96), which entered service around 2004–2005, only a year or two after its predecessor, the PHL96. As with the PHL96, the PHL03 is not exactly a guided SPMRL because it is the submunitions that are guided, not the rockets themselves.
  – Chinese development of the PHL03. This is actually the first model of the Chinese versions of the BM-30 SPMRL that is a truly a guided rocket system, in that the rockets themselves are guided by the simple primitive cascade inertial terminal guidance used on the WS series SPMRL, which became standard for later Chinese versions. Russia had already developed a guided version of the BM-30 with mid-course radio command guidance to immediately correct the error in the flight of the rocket once detected by the ballistic tracking radar, but this was not adopted due to financial constraints.
  – Chinese development of the AR-1. A 10-round version of the AR-1, with two launching boxes, each containing five expandable launching tubes. Once rockets are launched, the entire launch box is replaced, instead of individually reloading each tube as in earlier versions, thus greatly reducing the reload time.
 A-100E – Export variant of the AR-1A. In service with the Pakistan Army.
 AR-2 – Chinese development of the AR-1/1A manufactured by Norinco, with range increased to 130 km.
 AR-3 – Chinese system manufactured by Norinco launching 300 mm or 370 mm rockets
 Vilkha - A Ukrainian development of the Smerch system that entered service in 2018 with the Ukrainian Rocket Forces.

See also 

 Astros II MLRS
 BM-24 240 mm multiple rocket launcher
 BM-27 Uragan 220 mm multiple rocket launcher
 Fajr-5 333 mm rocket launcher
 HIMARS, U.S. multiple rocket launcher
 Katyusha BM-13 multiple rocket launchers of World War II
 M270, U.S. multiple rocket launcher
 Pinaka Multi Barrel Rocket Launcher, 214 mm Indian multiple rocket launcher
 TOROS 230–260 mm rocket launcher
 TOS-1 Buratino Heavy Flame Thrower System (multiple rocket / thermobaric weapon launcher)
 Vilkha 300 mm Ukrainian multiple rocket launcher

References 

 Russia's Arms Catalog 2004

Bibliography
 Jamie Prenatt and Adam Hook, Katyusha – Russian Multiple Rocket Launchers 1941–Present, New Vanguard 235, Osprey Publishing Ltd, Oxford 2016.

External links 

 Smerch – 9A52 – 300mm multi-barreled rocket launcher – Walk around photos
 Splav State Research and Production Enterprise

Wheeled self-propelled rocket launchers
Cold War artillery of the Soviet Union
Self-propelled artillery of Russia
Multiple rocket launchers of the Soviet Union
NPO Splav products
Modern thermobaric weapons of Russia
Cluster munition
Military vehicles introduced in the 1980s